The 2015–16 Asia League Ice Hockey season was the 13th season of Asia League Ice Hockey. The league consisted of nine teams from China, Japan, Russia, and South Korea.

Participating teams
The table below reveals participating teams in the 2015–16 season, their residence, and when they joined Asia League Ice Hockey.

Regular season
Below is the final standings in the regular season.

y – Clinched first-round bye; x – Clinched playoff spot; e - Eliminated from playoff contention.

Playoffs
The teams placed 3-6 in the regular season met in the first round, while the teams placed 1-2 were direct qualified for semifinals. The first round was determined in best out of three games, while the semifinal and the final were determined in best out of five games.

References 

Asia League Ice Hockey
Asia League Ice Hockey seasons
Asia
Asia